Brown Engineering may refer to:
 The Brown University School of Engineering
 The George R. Brown School of Engineering at Rice University
 Teledyne Brown Engineering, formerly Brown Engineering Company (BECO)